Jodok Wicki (born 20 July 1966) is a Swiss sailor. He competed at the 1988 Summer Olympics and the 1992 Summer Olympics.

References

External links
 

1966 births
Living people
Swiss male sailors (sport)
Olympic sailors of Switzerland
Sailors at the 1988 Summer Olympics – 470
Sailors at the 1992 Summer Olympics – 470
Place of birth missing (living people)